Irrigation is the artificial application of water to the land, soil or surfaces.

Irrigation may also refer to:

Agriculture 
 Drip irrigation, slow watering of roots
 Lift irrigation, irrigation where water is lifted using pumps or other means
 Surface irrigation, irrigation where water is applied using gravity
 Tidal irrigation, irrigation by river water under tidal influence
 Irrigation in viticulture, use of irrigation in wine-making

Health 
 Nasal irrigation, cleansing of the nose with water
 Therapeutic irrigation, cleansing with water in medicine

See also 
 Irrigation management